Top Country Albums is a chart that ranks the top-performing country music albums in the United States, published by Billboard.  Chart positions are based on multi-metric consumption, blending traditional album sales, track equivalent albums, and streaming equivalent albums.

In the issue of Billboard dated January 2, My Gift by Carrie Underwood was at number one, retaining the position it had held the previous week.  Underwood would return to number one in April with her next album, My Savior.  The only other artist with multiple number ones in 2021 was Taylor Swift, who spent time in the peak position with both Fearless (Taylor's Version) and Red (Taylor's Version).  Both were complete re-recordings of albums from earlier in her career, which she released following a dispute regarding ownership of the masters to her first six studio albums.

For much of the year, the number-one position was dominated by Dangerous: The Double Album by Morgan Wallen.  The album entered the chart at number one in the issue of Billboard dated January 23, and held the top spot for 11 consecutive weeks.  It returned to the peak position for a single week in the issue dated April 17, and reached number one again in the issue dated May 8. By the end of the year, the album had spent a total of 39 weeks atop the chart.  It also debuted at number one on the all-genres Billboard 200 chart, more than doubling the record for the highest weekly number of on-demand streams by a country album.

Chart history

See also
2021 in country music
List of Billboard number-one country songs of 2021

References

2021
United States Country Albums